Ashok Katariya is an Indian politician from the state of Uttar Pradesh and member of Uttar Pradesh Legislative Council and he has served as Transport Minister with Independent Charge and Minister of State for Parliamentary Affairs in the Government of Uttar Pradesh till March 2022.

Early life 
Katariya was born in a small village Heempur Prithya of Bijnor -Uttar Pradesh. He belongs to a farmer family. His father is Mr. Rumaal Singh (currently elected as the Gram Pradhan of Heempur Village 2021). He hails from a Gurjar family. He completed his primary education in his village.

Education 
Ashok Katariya holds a post-graduate degree in political science from Mahatma Jyotiba Phule Rohilkhand University, Bareilly.

Political career 
He was from the start a notable leader of Gurjar community. Katariya's political journey began with the Akhil Bharatiya Vidyarthi Parishad. Katariya was the organisational secretary of ABVP Moradabad Vibhag in 1994. In 1996, he was given responsibilities of Meerut Vibhag after that State secretary of Bharatiya Janata Yuva Morcha in 2001.  In 2004, Katariya was selected as President of BJYM Uttar Pradesh. In 2007 he was selected State secretary of BJP U.P. and served for consecutive terms till 2013. In 2013 he was given the responsibility of State vice president of BJP U.P. During the 2014 General elections, he was appointed Star campaigner of BJP in U.P. In 2016 he was given responsibility of General Secretary of BJP U.P. till 2020.

He has been appointed Transport Minister of State (Independent Charge) & Parliamentary Affairs Minister of State in Yogi Adityanath ministry on 21 August 2019.

References
https://www.jagran.com/uttar-pradesh/meerut-city-up-panchayat-chunav-father-of-transport-minister-ashok-kataria-became-head-of-village-unopposed-in-bijnor-21542493.html

https://www.hindustantimes.com/india-news/rajasthan-made-us-pay-for-kota-students-ride-home-up-govt-to-congress/story-bcqoI4kjDY3mtUH4GagpZM.html

https://english.newstracklive.com/news/up-transport-corporation-will-fill-the-vacant-posts-by-june-30-minister-ashok-kataria-gave-instructions-mc23-nu764-ta272-1101497-1.html

Members of the Uttar Pradesh Legislative Council
Living people
1972 births
Yogi ministry